Rebe Taylor is an English-born Australian historian and author specialising in southeast Australian indigenous peoples and European settlement.

Early life 
Taylor was born in London and came to live in Adelaide, South Australia with her family at the age of five. As a child she had several film roles, including in For the Term of His Natural Life (miniseries) (1983) and the Scott Hicks film, Sebastian and the Sparrow (1988).

Career 
Taylor studied for her MA in History at the University of Melbourne, graduating in 1996. She completed her PhD at the Australian National University in 2004.

In 2015 she was awarded the inaugural Coral Thomas Fellowship by the State Library of New South Wales. At the end of her two-year term she gave the inaugural Coral Thomas Lecture titled "The untold story of the Wedge Collection" on John Helder Wedge.

In April 2018 she became Senior Research Fellow at the College of Arts, Law and Education at the University of Tasmania.

Awards 

Winner, Non-Fiction Award at the Adelaide Festival Awards for Literature, 2004, for Unearthed: The Aboriginal Tasmanians of Kangaroo Island
Winner, University of Southern Queensland History Book Award at the 2017 Queensland Literary Awards, for Into the Heart of Tasmania: A Search for Human Antiquity
Winner, Tasmania Book Prize, Tasmanian Premier's Literary Prizes, 2017, for Into the Heart of Tasmania: A Search for Human Antiquity
Winner, Dick and Joan Green Family Award for Tasmanian History, 2018, for Into the Heart of Tasmania: A Search for Human Antiquity

Works

External links 

 Official website

References 

Year of birth missing (living people)
Australian historians
Australian women historians
University of Melbourne alumni
Australian National University alumni
Academic staff of the University of Tasmania
Living people